The 2007 Chase for the Nextel Cup was the ten-race playoffs which concluded the 2007 NASCAR Nextel Cup season. It began with the Sylvania 300 on September 16, 2007 at New Hampshire Motor Speedway and ended with the Ford 400 on November 18 of the same year at Homestead-Miami Speedway, with Jimmie Johnson winning the 2007 NASCAR Nextel Cup Championship.

The entry requirements for the Chase changed this year.  Previously, the top ten drivers in the points standings and anyone else within 400 points of the leader after the Chevy Rock and Roll 400 would qualify for the Chase.  This year, the top twelve drivers in the points standings after the Chevy Rock and Roll 400 automatically qualified for the Chase with each drivers' point total reset to 5,000 points, with a ten-point bonus for each race won during the first 26 races.  In addition, as NASCAR makes the full-time transition to the Car of Tomorrow, half of the races used the new template, and the other half used the older template, which was officially retired from Cup competition following the Ford 400.  The title "Chase for the Nextel Cup" was also retired, as the season ending playoff will be renamed the "Chase for the Sprint Cup" in 2008.

Final standings

Key: S-Starts; P-Poles; W-Wins; T5-Top 5 finishes; T10-Top 10 finishes; DNF-Did not finish; Pts-Points.
NOTES:'
1. The original seedings saw Edwards placed fourth ahead of Kurt Busch based on most second-place finishes, while Denny Hamlin was seeded sixth based on the same criteria, followed by Truex, Kenseth, Kyle Busch, Jeff Burton and Harvick, with further tiebreakers based on third-place finishes, etc.
2. Kurt Busch by most wins finished in seventh place ahead of Jeff Burton.
3. Those in boldface were invited to the 2007 Nextel Cup Banquet November 30 in New York.

Standings Plus/Minus Through The Chase

Chg = Change in position.
n/c = No change in position.
Std = Standing After Race

Standings at beginning of Chase
Jimmie Johnson, 5,060 points, leader
Jeff Gordon, 5,040, -20
Tony Stewart, 5,030, -30
Carl Edwards, 5,020, -40
Kurt Busch, 5,020, -40
Denny Hamlin, 5,010, -50
Martin Truex, Jr., 5,010, -50
Matt Kenseth, 5,010, -50
Kyle Busch, 5,010, -50
Jeff Burton, 5,010, -50
Kevin Harvick, 5,010, -50
Clint Bowyer, 5,000, -60

Standings at end of the "regular season"
At the conclusion of the "regular season" (the 2007 Chevy Rock & Roll 400), these were the point standings before the Chase adjustments were made.  Also indicated are how far up or down in the standings a driver went when the Chase points were awarded:
 Jeff Gordon, 3,849 pts., leader, down one spot.
 Tony Stewart, -312 pts, down one spot.
 Denny Hamlin, -359, down three spots.
 Jimmie Johnson, -410 pts., up three spots.
 Matt Kenseth, -419 pts., down three spots.
 Carl Edwards, -427 pts., up two spots.
 Jeff Burton, -521 pts., down three spots.
 Kyle Busch, -547 pts., down one spot.
 Clint Bowyer, -670 pts., down three spots.
 Kurt Busch, -689 pts. and two wins, up five spots.
 Martin Truex, Jr., -689 pts. and one win, up four spots.
 Kevin Harvick, -694 pts., up one spot.

Races
Drivers in italics did not qualify for the 2007 Chase.

KEY: S — Standard. CoT — Car of Tomorrow.
≠ — Did not qualify for 2006 Chase.

Race results
(NOTE: Actual finish is in parentheses.)

Race 1 - 2007 Sylvania 300

Finishing Order
Clint Bowyer (1)
Jeff Gordon (2)
Tony Stewart (3)
Kyle Busch (4)
Martin Truex Jr. (5)
Jimmie Johnson (6)
Matt Kenseth (7)
Carl Edwards (12)
Denny Hamlin (15)
Kevin Harvick (17)
Jeff Burton (18)
Kurt Busch (25)

Standings after race:
Jimmie Johnson, 5,210, Leader via most wins tiebreaker.
Jeff Gordon, 5,210
Tony Stewart, 5,200, -10
Clint Bowyer, 5,195, -15
Kyle Busch, 5,175, -35
Martin Truex, Jr., 5,170, -40
Matt Kenseth, 5,156, -54
Carl Edwards, 5,147, -63
Denny Hamlin, 5,128, -82
Kevin Harvick, 5,122, -88
Jeff Burton, 5,119, -91
Kurt Busch, 5,108, -102

Race 2 - 2007 Dodge Dealers 400

Finishing Order
Carl Edwards (1) ·
Kyle Busch (5)
Jeff Burton (7)
Tony Stewart (9)
Jeff Gordon (11)
Clint Bowyer (12)
Martin Truex, Jr. (13)
Jimmie Johnson (14)
Kevin Harvick (20)
Kurt Busch (29)
Matt Kenseth (35)
Denny Hamlin (38)

Standings after race (before penalty):
Jeff Gordon, 5,340
Tony Stewart, 5,338, -2
Carl Edwards, 5,337, -3
Jimmie Johnson, 5,336, -4
Kyle Busch, 5,330, -10
Clint Bowyer, 5,322, -18
Martin Truex, Jr., 5,294, -46
Jeff Burton, 5,265, -75
Kevin Harvick, 5,225, -115
Matt Kenseth, 5,224, -116
Kurt Busch, 5,189, -151
Denny Hamlin, 5,182, -158

Standings after race (after penalty):
Jeff Gordon, 5,340, leader
Tony Stewart, 5,338, -2
Jimmie Johnson, 5,336, -4
Kyle Busch, 5,330, -10
Clint Bowyer, 5,322, -18
Carl Edwards, 5,312, -28
Martin Truex, Jr., 5,294, -46
Jeff Burton, 5,265, -75
Kevin Harvick, 5,225, -115
Matt Kenseth, 5,224, -116
Kurt Busch, 5,189, -151
Denny Hamlin, 5,182, -158

Race 3 - 2007 LifeLock 400

Finishing order
Clint Bowyer (2)
Jimmie Johnson (3)
Jeff Gordon (4)
Kevin Harvick (6)
Kurt Busch (11)
Denny Hamlin (29)
Matt Kenseth (35)
Jeff Burton (36)
Carl Edwards (37)
Martin Truex Jr. (38)
Tony Stewart (29)
Kyle Busch (41)

Standings after race:
Jimmie Johnson, 5,506, leader
Jeff Gordon, 5,505, -1
Clint Bowyer, 5,492, -14
Tony Stewart, 5,384, -17
Kevin Harvick, 5,380, -126
Kyle Busch, 5,370, -136
Carl Edwards, 5,346, -142
Martin Truex Jr., 5,348, -158
Kurt Busch, 5,379, -177
Jeff Burton, 5,370, -186
Matt Kenseth, 5,287, -219
Denny Hamlin, 5,258, -248

Race 4 - 2007 UAW-Ford 500

Finishing order
Jeff Gordon (1)
Jimmie Johnson (2)
Denny Hamlin (4)
Kurt Busch (7)
Tony Stewart (8)
Clint Bowyer (11)
Carl Edwards (14)
Kevin Harvick (20)
Matt Kenseth (26)
Kyle Busch (36)
Martin Truex Jr. (42)
Jeff Burton (43)

Standings after race:
Jeff Gordon 5,690, leader
Jimmie Johnson 5,681, -9
Clint Bowyer 5,627, -63
Tony Stewart 5,536, -154
Kevin Harvick 5,488, -202
Carl Edwards 5,485, -205
Kurt Busch 5,475, -215
Kyle Busch 5,430, -260
Denny Hamlin 5,428, -262
Martin Truex, Jr. 5,390, -300
Matt Kenseth 5,372, -318
Jeff Burton 5,354, -336

Race 5 - 2007 Bank of America 500

Finishing order
Jeff Gordon (1)
Clint Bowyer (2)
Kyle Busch (3)
Jeff Burton (4)
Carl Edwards (5)
Tony Stewart (7)
Jimmie Johnson (14)
Martin Truex Jr. (17)
Denny Hamlin (20)
Kurt Busch (26)
Kevin Harvick (33)
Matt Kenseth (34)

Standings after race:
Jeff Gordon 5880, leader
Jimmie Johnson 5,812, -68
Clint Bowyer 5,802, -78
Tony Stewart 5,682, -198
Carl Edwards 5,640, -240
Kyle Busch 5,600, -280
Kurt Busch 5,565, -315
Kevin Harvick 5,552, -328
Denny Hamlin 5,531, -349
Jeff Burton 5,514, -366
Martin Truex Jr. 5,502, -378
Matt Kenseth 5,438, -442

Race 6 - 2007 Subway 500

Finishing order
Jimmie Johnson (1)
Jeff Gordon (3)
Kyle Busch (4)
Matt Kenseth (5)
Denny Hamlin (6)
Clint Bowyer (9)
Kevin Harvick (10)
Carl Edwards (11)
Jeff Burton (12)
Tony Stewart (13)
Martin Truex Jr. (19)
Kurt Busch (31)

Standings after race:
Jeff Gordon 6055, leader
Jimmie Johnson 6002, -53
Clint Bowyer 5940, -115
Tony Stewart 5806, -249
Carl Edwards 5770, -285
Kyle Busch 5764, -290
Kevin Harvick 5686, -369
Denny Hamlin 5681, -374
Jeff Burton 5646, -409
Kurt Busch 5635, -420
Martin Truex Jr. 5608, -447
Matt Kenseth 5593, -462

Race 7 - 2007 Pep Boys Auto 500

Finishing order
Jimmie Johnson (1)
Carl Edwards (2)
Matt Kenseth (4)
Jeff Burton (5)
Clint Bowyer (6)
Jeff Gordon (7)
Kurt Busch (8)
Kevin Harvick (15)
Kyle Busch (20)
Denny Hamlin (24)
Tony Stewart (30)
Martin Truex Jr. (31)

Standings after race:
Jeff Gordon 6201, leader
Jimmie Johnson 6192, -9
Clint Bowyer 6090, -111
Carl Edwards 5940, -261
Tony Stewart 5879, -322
Kyle Busch 5873, -328
Kevin Harvick 5809, -392
Jeff Burton 5801, -400
Kurt Busch 5782, -419
Denny Hamlin 5777, -424
Matt Kenseth 5752, -448
Martin Truex Jr. 5688, -513

NOTE: Drivers in Italics are mathematically eliminated from winning the championship.

Race 8 - 2007 Dickies 500

Finishing order
Jimmie Johnson (1)
Matt Kenseth (2)
Martin Truex Jr. (3)
Kyle Busch (4)
Jeff Burton (6)
Jeff Gordon (7)
Kurt Busch (8)
Kevin Harvick (10)
Tony Stewart (11)
Clint Bowyer (19)
Carl Edwards (26)
Denny Hamlin (29)

Standings after race:
Jimmie Johnson 6382, leader
Jeff Gordon 6352, -30
Clint Bowyer 6201, -181
Kyle Busch 6043, -339
Carl Edwards 6025, -357
Tony Stewart 6009, -373
Jeff Burton 5951, -431
Kevin Harvick 5943, -439
Kurt Busch 5929, -453
Matt Kenseth 5928, -454
Denny Hamlin 5858, -524
Martin Truex Jr. 5858, -524

NOTES: 1. Drivers in Italics are mathematically eliminated from winning the championship.
2. Carl Edwards and Tony Stewart were mathematically eliminated when Jimmie Johnson started the 2007 Checker Auto Parts 500

Race 9 - 2007 Checker Auto Parts 500

Finishing order
Jimmie Johnson (1)
Matt Kenseth (3)
Tony Stewart (4)
Kevin Harvick (6)
Martin Truex Jr. (7)
Kyle Busch (8)
Jeff Burton (9)
Jeff Gordon (10)
Clint Bowyer (11)
Kurt Busch (12)
Denny Hamlin (16)
Carl Edwards (42)

Standings after race:
Jimmie Johnson 6572, leader
Jeff Gordon 6486, -86
Clint Bowyer 6331, -241
Kyle Busch 6185, -387
Tony Stewart 6169, -403
Matt Kenseth 6103, -469
Kevin Harvick 6093, -479
Jeff Burton 6089, -483
Carl Edwards 6067, -505
Kurt Busch 6056, -516
Martin Truex, Jr. 6009, -593
Denny Hamlin 5973, -599

NOTE: Drivers in italics are mathematically eliminated from winning the championship.

Race 10 - 2007 Ford 400

Finishing order
Matt Kenseth (1)
Kurt Busch (2)
Denny Hamlin (3)
Jeff Gordon (4)
Carl Edwards (5)
Martin Truex, Jr. (6)
Jimmie Johnson (7)
Jeff Burton (8)
Kevin Harvick (19)
Kyle Busch (20)
Tony Stewart (30)
Clint Bowyer (39)

Final standings:
Jimmie Johnson, 6,723 pts, 2007 Series Champion
Jeff Gordon, -77 pts
Clint Bowyer, -346 pts
Matt Kenseth, -425 pts
Kyle Busch, -430 pts
Tony Stewart, -481 pts
Kurt Busch, -492 pts*
Jeff Burton, -492 pts
Carl Edwards, -501 pts
Kevin Harvick, -524 pts
Martin Truex Jr., -559 pts
Denny Hamlin, -580 pts

* - Kurt Busch finished one place ahead of Jeff Burton based on most wins (Two wins vs. one).

Television
ABC carried the entire Chase for the Nextel Cup in 2007, marking the first time that the entire Chase was carried on network television.  (In previous years, it had been on a combination of NBC and TNT.)  The commentators for ABC were Jerry Punch and Rusty Wallace, who are joined by newcomer Andy Petree, a former team owner and Dale Earnhardt's crew chief in 1993 and 1994.  The hosts were Brent Musburger (race) and Suzy Kolber (studio).

See also
2007 NASCAR Nextel Cup Series
2007 NASCAR Busch Series
2007 NASCAR Craftsman Truck Series

References

External links and sources
 Official NASCAR site
 RacingOne 
 Jayski's Silly Season Site
 Speed Channel
 ThatsRacin.com
 RacinFreek.com hosted by Freewebs.com

Chase for the Nextel Cup
Chase for the Nextel Cup
Chase for the Nextel Cup
Chase for the Nextel Cup